David Slater (born 1962) is an American singer.

David Slater is also the name of:
 David A. Slater (1866–1938), English classicist, academic and schoolmaster
 David W. Slater (1921–2010), Canadian economist, civil servant and former President of York University
 David Slater, author of Killing for Culture
 David J. Slater, British nature photographer from Mathern, South Wales, known for the so-called monkey selfies
 David Slater, see 1976 IAAF World Cross Country Championships
 Dave Slater, see List of Canada national rugby union players